Julian Mark Caruthers Alsop (born 28 May 1973) is an English former professional footballer.

Career 

A tall, strong striker, Alsop first came to prominence with Bristol Rovers before joining Swansea City in 1998 for £30,000 immediately following a loan deal.

He signed for Cheltenham Town from Swansea and was less than prolific in his first season, but his second year with the club proved to be a revelation. His partnership with Tony Naylor led to Alsop scoring 26 goals, including the second goal as Cheltenham beat Rushden and Diamonds 3–1 in the Division Three play-off final. His third and final season with the club was beset by injuries and he left Cheltenham for Oxford United at the end of 2002–03 season.

Alsop was sacked by Oxford United in October 2004 for a lewd prank in which he tried to stick a banana up a Oxford United's youth players backside. Two Oxford United youth players Craig Davies and James Tweed were suspended for taking part in the prank.

After he was sacked by Oxford United, Alsop signed for Northampton Town during the 2004-2005 season.

When the season was over he signed for Conference National side Forest Green Rovers. After a brief spell at fellow Conference team Tamworth he returned to Forest Green Rovers.

He signed for Conference South team Newport County in July 2006 after being released from his contract at Forest Green. During his time at Newport they twice narrowly missed out on the promotion play-offs and twice appeared in the FAW Premier Cup final, winning the 2008 final. Alsop was released by Newport at the end of the 2007–08 season.

Other clubs include Halesowen and Northampton Town.

Alsop signed for Cirencester Town after being released from Newport County on a free transfer but left the side after several months to sign for Bishops Cleeve.

On 20 July 2009, Alsop made a surprise return to the Football League and signed a non-contract, month-by month agreement with Cheltenham Town, after playing in the first three pre-season friendlies for the club.

He came off the bench on 18 August away at Rochdale to score a 90th minute winning goal in a 1–0 victory for Cheltenham Town.

He was released by the club along with seven other players in May 2010. In July 2010, he returned to Bishop's Cleeve. Alsop announced that he was set to retire from football on 25 April 2011. He had made 34 league appearances during his second spell at Bishop's Cleeve, scoring eight goals.

In January 2012 he came out of retirement to play for Welsh club Carmarthen Town. He made his début for Carmarthen Town as a second-half substitute in a 2–1 win over Aberystwyth Town on 2 January, and remained with the club until December 2012, making twelve league appearances in total.

In January 2014, Alsop joined Welsh League outfit Monmouth Town.

References

External links 

1973 births
Living people
English footballers
Sportspeople from Nuneaton
Association football forwards
Nuneaton Borough F.C. players
Rugby Town F.C. players
Racing Club Warwick F.C. players
Tamworth F.C. players
Halesowen Town F.C. players
Bristol Rovers F.C. players
Swansea City A.F.C. players
Cheltenham Town F.C. players
Oxford United F.C. players
Northampton Town F.C. players
Forest Green Rovers F.C. players
Newport County A.F.C. players
Cirencester Town F.C. players
Bishop's Cleeve F.C. players
Carmarthen Town A.F.C. players
Monmouth Town F.C. players
English Football League players
National League (English football) players
Cymru Premier players